The men's Individual large hill ski jumping event at the FIS Nordic World Ski Championships 2013 was held on 28 February 2013. A qualification was held on 27 February 2013.

Results

Qualifying
The qualification was started at 17:00.

Final
The final was started at 17:00.

References

FIS Nordic World Ski Championships 2013